HVR may refer to:
 Hidden Valley Ranch
 HVR Consulting Services Ltd., now part of Qinetiq
 Havre City–County Airport in Montana, United States
 Hemlock Valley Resort, in British Columbia, Canada
 Hotham Valley Railway, in Western Australia
 Hypervariable region, a location within nuclear or mitochondrial DNA
 Hypoxic ventilatory response